The year 1884 in architecture involved some significant architectural events and new buildings.

Buildings and structures

Buildings

 Antoni Gaudí begins work on the Sagrada Família church in Barcelona.
 Washington Monument in Washington, D.C., designed by Robert Mills, is completed.
 Hungarian Royal Opera House in Budapest, designed by Miklós Ybl, is opened.
 Budapest Keleti railway station, designed by Gyula Rochlitz and János Feketeházy, is completed.
 Garabit viaduct in France, engineered by Gustave Eiffel and Maurice Koechlin, is completed.
 The Dakota apartment building on the Upper West Side of Manhattan in New York City, designed by Henry Janeway Hardenbergh, is completed.
 Cornerstone of Statue of Liberty laid in New York Harbor.

Awards
 RIBA Royal Gold Medal – William Butterfield.
 Grand Prix de Rome, architecture: Hector d'Espouy.

Births
 February 6 – Vlastislav Hofman, Czech artist and Cubist-influenced architect (died 1964)
 February 12 – Norman Jewson, English Arts and Crafts architect (died 1975)
 July 6 – Willem Marinus Dudok, Dutch Modernist architect (died 1974)
 August 27 – Alfredo Baldomir, Uruguayan soldier, architect and politician (died 1948)
 September 26 – Antonio Barluzzi, Italian Franciscan friar and architect, known as the "Architect of the Holy Land" (died 1960)
 November 24 – Michel de Klerk, Dutch Amsterdam School architect (died 1923)
 Ernest George Trobridge, British architect (died 1942)

Deaths
 January 8 – Eugenius Birch, English naval architect, engineer and noted pier builder (born 1818)
 February 10 – Richard Shackleton Pope, English architect working in Bristol (born 1793)
 March 26 – Edward Milner, English landscape architect (born 1819)
 July 27 – Frigyes Feszl, Hungarian architect, a significant figure in the romantic movement (born 1821)
 August 3 – Paul Abadie, French architect and building restorer (born 1812)
 October 19 – Major Rohde Hawkins, English school and church architect (born 1821)

References

Years in architecture
Buildings and structures completed in 1884